Sir John William Downer, KCMG, KC (6 July 1843 – 2 August 1915) was an Australian politician who served two terms as Premier of South Australia, from 1885 to 1887 and again from 1892 to 1893. He later entered federal politics and served as a Senator for South Australia from 1901 to 1903. He was the first of four Australian politicians from the Downer family dynasty.

Early life
Born in Adelaide, John Downer (the son of Henry Downer who came to South Australia in 1838 and Jane Downer ) was educated on a scholarship at St Peter's College, Adelaide,. On 23 March 1867 he was admitted to the bar, and soon won a reputation as being among Adelaide's most talented and eloquent lawyers.

South Australian politician

Downer became a Queen's Counsel in 1878, the same year in which he was elected to the House of Assembly for Barossa. He represented this constituency until 1901, leaving it only to enter federal politics.

In the House of Assembly he soon made his mark and became Attorney-General in John Cox Bray's cabinet on 24 June 1881. He endeavoured to bring in several law reforms, and though his married women's property bill was not passed, he succeeded in carrying bills allowing accused persons to give evidence on oath, and amending the insolvency and marriage acts. The government was defeated in June 1884, but a year later, on 16 June 1885, Downer himself became Premier for the first time, as well as being Attorney-General once again.

While Premier, Downer oversaw the construction of the first train line from Adelaide to Melbourne. He also made significant contributions to establishing irrigation settlements along the Murray River. Although this ministry lasted two years and passed a fair amount of legislation, it was often in difficulties, and in June 1886 had to be reconstructed.

At the Colonial Conference held in London during 1887, Downer represented South Australia, but during his return journey to Australia his government was defeated. This ministry was responsible for a tariff imposing increased protective duties. Downer was not in office again for several years, but in October 1892 again became Premier, taking also the portfolio of Chief Secretary. In May 1893 he exchanged this for the position of Treasurer of South Australia, but was ousted at the 1893 election by liberal Protectionist Kingston with the support of the new Labor Party led by John McPherson. Downer remarked of this party: 'They are very clever fellows. I have great respect for the way they use either side for their purposes with absolute impartiality'. For most of the period until 1899 Downer led the Opposition.

Downer was a strong federalist and had represented South Australia at the 1883 and 1891 conventions. At the latter meeting, he took an important part in protecting the interests of the smaller states, and was a member of the constitutional committee. He was elected one of the 10 representatives of South Australia at the Australasian Federal Convention of 1897-8, and sat, again, on the constitutional committee. He was the most senior and significant representative of the conservative portion of the Convention's ideological spectrum. In this period he formed a close personal bond with several leading Federationists. Robert Garran, an eminence grise of the Federalist cause, was the best man at Downer's wedding in 1898. Richard O'Connor and Edmund Barton were among the attendees. The bride and groom had first met at Barton's house, and in these years Barton would stay at Downer's house when in Adelaide.

Federal politician and return to state politics
In the inaugural election of the parliament of the Commonwealth of Australia, Downer stood for the Senate, without party label, but campaigning closely with fellow candidate and conservative, Sir Richard Baker. On the hustings he declared he "was not a Free Trader, and not a Protectionist", but "a Fair Trader". He won one of the six vacancies, but, badly disappointed in not being appointed to the High Court, he did not seek re-election in 1903. He entered the South Australian Legislative Council as a National Defence League (Liberal Union from 1910) representative of the southern district in 1905, and continued to be re-elected until his death on 2 August 1915.

Character
Alfred Deakin assessed Downer in the following terms: 'bull-headed, and rather thick-necked, ... with the dogged set of the mouth of a prize fighter' and 'smallish eyes'. Downer was regarded a first-rate barrister, and some of his speeches to juries were singled out by contemporaries as laudable examples of forensic art. He was equally successful in parliamentary debate; one of his colleagues called him the best debater in a house that contained Charles Kingston, Frederick Holder, John Cockburn, and John Jenkins.

In politics Downer tended to be conservative without being obstinate. He described himself as a Tory, and partly on account of this he often found himself in a minority during his later years in parliament. Nevertheless, he consistently advocated the rights of married women to their own property, female suffrage, protection of local industries, and federation.

Family and legacy

Downer married twice: firstly in 1871 to Elizabeth Henderson (c. 1852 – 3 May 1896), daughter of the controversial Rev. James Henderson; and secondly, in Sydney 29 November 1899 to Una Stella Haslingden Russell, daughter of Henry Edward Russell. With Elizabeth he had three children, John Henry (born 1872), James Frederick (born 1874) and Harold Sydney (born in 1875 and died in infancy).
The son of his second marriage was Alexander Russell "Alick" Downer (born 1910), who served in the Menzies government, was knighted, and served as Australian High Commissioner in London, and whose son, Alexander Downer served as leader of the (Opposition) Liberal party in 1994 and Foreign Minister in the Howard government.

The home he purchased in 1880 at 42 Pennington Terrace, North Adelaide, is now St Mark's College and the original part of the building is known as Downer House. A draft of the Australian Constitution was prepared in the ballroom in 1897.

A brother and partner in his business, Henry Edward Downer (1836–1905), entered the South Australian parliament in 1881 and was attorney-general in the John Cockburn ministry from May to August 1890. Another brother,  George Downer (1839–1916) was his partner in the legal firm G & J Downer and a prominent businessman.

In 1887, at the Imperial Conference in London (now the Commonwealth Heads of Government Meeting), Downer was created KCMG, recommended to the Queen by the Marquis of Salisbury.
During retirement, he joined the Adelaide University Council and became president of the Commonwealth Club.

The Canberra suburb of Downer, Australian Capital Territory was named after him in 1960. On Garema Place, Canberra stands a commemorative sculpted fountain titled Father and Son and was presented by his son Sir Alick in 1964.

Electoral History

South Australia

House of Assembly

Legislative Council

Australian Senate

See also
Downer family

Notes and references

Sources

Parliamentary Debates (South Australia), 1883–84, 2031
Intercolonial Convention, 1883: Report of the Proceedings of the Intercolonial Convention, held in Sydney, in November and December, 1883 (Syd, 1883)
Proceedings of the Colonial Conference, 1887: Papers Laid before the Conference (Lond, 1887)
National Australasian Convention, 1891 to 1898, Official Record of the Proceedings … (Sydney 1891, Adelaide 1897, Sydney 1898 and Melbourne 1898)
British Australasian, 17 June 1887
Edmund Barton papers (National Library of Australia)
Alfred Deakin papers (National Library of Australia)
P. M. Glynn diaries, 1880–1918 (National Library of Australia)
The Register, Adelaide, 3 August 1915
The Advertiser, Adelaide, 3 August 1915
E. Hodder, The History of South Australia
Quick and Garran, The Annotated Constitution of the Australian Commonwealth
P. Mennell, The Dictionary of Australasian Biography

External links

 

|-

|-

|-

|-

|-

|-

1843 births
1915 deaths
Premiers of South Australia
Attorneys-General of South Australia
Australian barristers
Australian suffragists
Australian federationists
Politicians from Adelaide
Australian people of English descent
Members of the Australian Senate for South Australia
Members of the Australian Senate
Members of the South Australian Legislative Council
Australian Knights Commander of the Order of St Michael and St George
Australian politicians awarded knighthoods
People educated at St Peter's College, Adelaide
John
Leaders of the Opposition in South Australia
Treasurers of South Australia
Australian King's Counsel
Male feminists
Protectionist Party members of the Parliament of Australia
19th-century Australian politicians
20th-century Australian politicians
Burials at North Road Cemetery